Özgön or Uzgen is a town in Osh Region, Kyrgyzstan. It is a city of district significance and the seat of Özgön District. Its population was 62,802 in 2021.

History
The town is mentioned in Chinese annals of the second century BC. It was one of the capitals of the Karakhanids, who called it Mavarannahr and left three well-preserved mausolea. Özgön became the abode of Muhammad b. Nasr during the Kara-Khanid split into two branches.

Accounts of Özgön were found in the works of Arab writers like Al-Muqaddasi and Ibn Hawqal in the 10th century.

Population

Geography
Özgön is located at the far eastern end of the Ferghana Valley, upstream of the point where the  Kara-Darya enters the valley. It is 30 miles northeast of Osh, and 20 miles southeast of Jalal-Abad on the banks of the Kara-Darya, on its right side.

Climate 
Özgön has a hot summer Mediterranean continental climate (Köppen climate classification Dsa). Summers are hot and dry. Precipitation occurs mostly in winter and its adjacent months.

Famous people

 Salizhan Sharipov, born in 1964, astronaut
One of the middle/high schools of Özgön was named after him.

References

External links
ÖZGÄND, Encyclopædia Iranica

Archaeological sites in Kyrgyzstan
Populated places in Osh Region